RMIT's School of Global, Urban and Social Studies is an Australian tertiary education school within the College of Design and Social Context at the Royal Melbourne Institute of Technology (RMIT University), located in Melbourne, Victoria.
This university organizational unit confers an interdisciplinary PhD in "Global, Urban and Social Studies"

See also
RMIT University

References

External links
School of Global, Urban and Social Studies

Global, Urban and Social Studies
Schools of social work
Schools of international relations
Language schools
Public policy schools
Public administration schools
Urban studies and planning schools